The 2022 Camden London Borough Council election took place on 5 May 2022. All 55 members of Camden London Borough Council were elected. The elections took place alongside local elections in the other London boroughs and elections to local authorities across the United Kingdom.

In the previous election in 2018, the Labour Party maintained its control of the council, winning 43 out of the 54 seats with the Conservative Party forming the primary opposition with seven of the remaining seats. The Liberal Democrats and Green Party were also elected to the council, with three seats and one seat respectively. The 2022 election took place under new election boundaries, which increased the number of councillors to 55.

Labour held control of the council, winning 47 seats. The Liberal Democrats overtook the Conservatives as the second-largest group, winning four seats.

Background

History 

The thirty-two London boroughs were established in 1965 by the London Government Act 1963. They are the principal authorities in Greater London and have responsibilities including education, housing, planning, highways, social services, libraries, recreation, waste, environmental health and revenue collection. Some of the powers are shared with the Greater London Authority, which also manages passenger transport, police and fire.

Since its formation, Camden has variously been under Labour control, no overall control and Conservative control. Only Labour, Conservative, Liberal Democrat and Green councillors have been elected to the council. The council has had an overall Labour majority since the 2010 election, in which Labour won thirty seats, the Liberal Democrats won thirteen, the Conservatives won ten and the Greens won a single seat. The Liberal Democrats lost all but one of their seats in the 2014 election, with Labour gaining ten and the Conservatives gaining two. The Green Party maintained their seat, at this point held by the party's future leader Siân Berry. The most recent election in 2018 saw Labour make further gains to win 43 seats with 47.6% of the overall vote. The Conservatives fell to five seats with 20.5% of the vote, the Liberal Democrats won three with 17.4% of the vote and Berry held her seat for the Green Party with her party winning 12.6% of the vote across the borough. The incumbent leader of the council is the Labour councillor Georgia Gould, who has held that position since 2017.

Council term 
In November 2019, a Labour councillor for Haverstock ward, Abi Wood, resigned as a councillor. The by-election to replace her was held on 12 December 2019, the same date as the 2019 general election. The Labour candidate, Gail McAnena-Wood, won. The leader of the Liberal Democrat group on the council, Luisa Porritt, stood as her party's candidate in the 2021 London mayoral election, coming fourth with 4.4% of the vote.

In June 2021, the Liberal Democrat councillor for Fortune Green ward, Flick Rea, resigned. A by-election to replace her was held on 22 July 2021, which was won by the Liberal Democrat candidate and former councillor for the ward Nancy Jirira. A Labour councillor for Fortune Green, Lorna Russell, defected to the Green Party in November 2021, saying that her previous party had "changed a lot". In the same month, the Labour councillor Lazzaro Pietragnoli resigned first as the Labour group whip and then as a councillor after he admitted he had run an anonymous Twitter account that he used to promote himself and attack his colleagues. In December 2021, the Conservative group leader Oliver Cooper said he would change wards to the Belsize, which was marginal between his party and the Liberal Democrats. In February 2022, Porritt announced she would stand down as a councillor at the 2022 election, citing work commitments. In March 2022, Ali Hassan Ali, a Conservative candidate in West Hampstead, stood down as a candidate and defected to the Labour Party, describing the local Conservative Party as "toxic". Party organisers claimed that he had been abusive, which Ali denied.

Along with most other London boroughs, Camden was subject to a boundary review ahead of the 2022 election. The Local Government Boundary Commission for England concluded that the council should have 55 seats, an increase of one, and produced new election boundaries following a period of consultation.

Electoral process 
Camden, like other London borough councils, elects all of its councillors at once every four years. The previous election took place in 2018. The election will take place using Plurality block voting, with each ward being represented by two or three councillors. Electors will have as many votes as there are councillors to be elected in their ward, with the top two or three being elected.

All registered electors (British, Irish, Commonwealth and European Union citizens) living in London aged 18 or over will be entitled to vote in the election. People who live at two addresses in different councils, such as university students with different term-time and holiday addresses, are entitled to be registered for and vote in elections in both local authorities. Voting in-person at polling stations will take place from 7:00 to 22:00 on election day, and voters will be able to apply for postal votes or proxy votes in advance of the election.

Campaign 
The Evening Standard reported that junctions near Holborn tube station where several cyclists had been killed might be a factor in the election, after planned changes were paused due to the COVID-19 pandemic affecting funding. The Conservatives proposed holding online referendums for every major policy.

Previous council composition

Results summary

As the wards of the London Borough of Camden were redrawn between the 2018 and 2022 elections, the seat changes for each party are based on notional results generated by the BBC, which estimate the outcome of the 2018 election if the new ward boundaries had been used.

Results by ward 
Candidates seeking re-election are marked with an asterisk (*). Councillors seeking re-election for a different ward are marked with a cross (†). Data from Camden Borough Council.

Belsize

Bloomsbury

Camden Square

Camden Town

Fortune Green

Frognal

Gospel Oak

Hampstead Town

Haverstock

Highgate

Holborn and Covent Garden

Kentish Town North

Kentish Town South

Kilburn

King's Cross

Primrose Hill

Regent's Park

South Hampstead

St Pancras and Somers Town

West Hampstead

By-elections

Hampstead Town

Notes

References 

Council elections in the London Borough of Camden
Camden